Chitrakoot district is one of the districts of Uttar Pradesh state of India in the Bundelkhand region and Chitrakoot town is the district headquarters. Chitrakoot district is a part of Chitrakoot Division. The district occupies an area of 3,216 km².The district has a population of 991,730 (2011 Census). As of 2011 it is the second least populated district of Uttar Pradesh (out of 75), after Mahoba.

Economy
In 2006 the Ministry of Panchayati Raj named Chitrakoot one of the country's 250 most backward districts (out of a total of 640). It is one of the 34 districts in Uttar Pradesh currently receiving funds from the Backward Regions Grant Fund Programme (BRGF).
Successive governments have often ignored the district's development and hence has become one of the most remote and cut-off districts in India.

Administration

Tehsils
The Chitrakoot district is divided into 4 Sub-Divisions (Tehsils),  each headed by a SDM.

 Karwi
 Mau
 Manikpur 
 Rajapur

Blocks
The Chitrakoot district is divided into 5 Community Development Blocks, each headed by a BDO.

 Karwi
 Mau
 Pahari
 Ramnagar
 Manikpur

Transportation

Closest Airport to Chitrakoot is in Allahabad which is 106 kilometers (65.8 miles) away and has flights to major destinations such as Delhi, Bangaluru, Mumbai, Kolkata etc.

Manikpur Junction railway station, located at Manikpur Sarhat is a major railway station in Chitrakoot district, providing train connections to Mumbai, Kolkata, Patna, New Delhi, etc.

Demographics

According to the 2011 census Chitrakoot district has a population of 991,730, roughly equal to the nation of Fiji or the US state of Montana. This gives it a ranking of 448th in India (out of a total of 640).
Its population growth rate over the decade 2001-2011 was 29.29%. Chitrakoot has a sex ratio of 879 females for every 1000 males, and a literacy rate of 66.52%. Scheduled Castes made up 26.89% of the population.

At the time of the 2011 Census of India, 68.61% of the population in the district spoke Hindi and 30.52% Bundeli as their first language. Chitrakoot is located at the junction of Bundeli, Awadhi and Bagheli dialects.

Notes

External links

Chitrakoot District on Bundelkhanddarshan.com 
 
 Chitrakoot @ Bundelkhand's unofficial web site 
 Chitrakoot Information Guide

 
Districts of Uttar Pradesh